is a Japanese actor. He won the award for best actor at the 24th Yokohama Film Festival for Hush! and at the 27th Hochi Film Award for Hush! and Harmful Insect.

Filmography

Film
 Atashi wa juice (1996)
 April Story (1998)
 Blues Harp (1998)
 Ring 0: Birthday (2000)
 Hush! (2001)
 Harmful Insect (2002)
 Atagoal wa Neko no Mori (2006), Gilbars (voice)
 Happy Flight (2008)
 Liar Game: The Final Stage (2010)
 Mother's Trees (2015)
 The 100th Love with You (2017), Shuntaro Hasegawa
 Psychic Kusuo (2017), Kuniharu Saiki
 Bleach (2018), Kisuke Urahara
 Snow Flower (2019), Wakamura
 A Garden of Camellias (2021)
 Inori (2021)

Television
 Asunaro Hakusho (1993)
 Rasen (1999)
 Tramps Like Us (2003)
 Damens Walker (2006)
 Fūrin Kazan (2007)
 Hotelier (2007)
 Kami no Shizuku (2009)
 Shōkōjo Seira (2009)
 Twin Spica (2009)
 Toge (2016)
 Chichi, Nobunaga (2017), Kazuo Oda
 Detective Yuri Rintaro (2020), Todoroki
 Reach Beyond the Blue Sky (2021), Odaka Junchū
 Ann's Lyrics: Ann Sakuragi's Haiku Lessons (2021)
 Only Just Married (2021), Satoshi Morita
 My Love Mix-Up! (2021), Masahiro Taniguchi
 DCU: Deep Crime Unit (2022), Akio Totsuka (ep. 8)
What Will You Do, Ieyasu? (2023), Anayama Baisetsu
Ranman (2023), Motoyoshi Noda

References

1969 births
Living people
Japanese male film actors
Japanese male television actors
Male actors from Tokyo
20th-century Japanese male actors
21st-century Japanese male actors